Nizamabad (Urdu: نظام آباد) is a small town near Wazirabad in Gujranwala District, Punjab, Pakistan. It is about a kilometer from Wazirabad towards Lahore. And 100 km from lahore, 40 km from Gujranwala

Nizamabad also has many manufacturers of cutlery, which mainly provide raw material for bigger industries in Wazirabad. Nizamabad has one girls college. It also has a school for primary education.

See also 
 Wazirabad

References

Cities and towns in Gujranwala District